Chithode or Chittode is a panchayat town adjoining Erode City in the state of Tamil Nadu, India. It is situated on the National Highway 47 between Coimbatore and Salem at the junction of Erode-Sathy-Mysore highway.

Demographics
 India census, Chithode had a population of 7,695. Males constitute 51% of the population and females 49%. Chithode has an average literacy rate of 70%, higher than the national average of 59.5%; with male literacy of 78% and female literacy of 61%. 8% of the population is under 6 years of age.

Government College of Engineering, Erode (erstwhile Institute of Road & Transport Technology (IRTT)) is located here. It occupies Aavin Dairy plant of Erode.

Location
It is located at a distance of 8 km from Erode Central Bus Terminus and 10 km from Erode Junction railway station on NH-544 Salem-Kochi Bypass in between Perundurai and Bhavani.

References

Cities and towns in Erode district